The deific decree delusion is a defense in a criminal case in which a person committed a crime in the belief that God ordered them to do it. This would make the perpetrator legally insane as they would be incapable of distinguishing right from wrong.

References

Criminal defenses
Criminal law
Hallucinations
Legal ethics